Largy is a small hamlet and townland in County Londonderry, Northern Ireland. It is 5 km south of Limavady, beside the B192 Limavady to Dungiven road. In 1991, its population was 90 but in the 2001 Census this had risen to 144. It is situated within Causeway Coast and Glens district.

Features

Education

Religion

References 

Villages in County Londonderry
Townlands of County Londonderry
Causeway Coast and Glens district